Cólera is a Brazilian punk rock band formed in October 1979 in São Paulo, by the brothers Redson (guitar and lead vocals) and Pierre (drums) and their friend  Val (bass guitar). They are currently one of the oldest punk bands in activity in Brazil, with a career that spans almost 30 years. They have toured Europe three times, in 1987, 2004 and 2008.

On September 28, 2011, Redson died from stomach bleeding at the age of 49. Cólera continues to play with a new formation: Wendel Barros on vocals and Cacá Saffiotti on guitar. In July 2016, their 1986 album Pela Paz em Todo o Mundo was elected by Rolling Stone Brasil as the 2nd best Brazilian punk rock album. Their album Acorde, Acorde, Acorde was elected among the 25 best Brazilian albums of the second half of 2018 by the São Paulo Association of Art Critics.

Discography

Albums
 Tente Mudar o Amanhã (1985) - Ataque Frontal
 Pela Paz Em Todo o Mundo (1986) - Ataque Frontal
 Cólera European Tour '87 (1988) - A. Indie Records
 Verde, Não Devaste! (1989) - Devil Discos
 Mundo Mecânico, Mundo Eletrônico (1991) - Devil Discos
 Caos Mental Geral (1998) - Devil Discos
 20 Anos ao Vivo (2002) - Devil Discos
 Deixe a Terra em Paz! (2004) - Devil Discos
 The Best Of - Alemanha (2004) - Dirty Faces
 Primeiros Sintomas (2006)
 Acorde! Acorde! Acorde! (2018) - EAEO Records

EPs
 Dê o Fora (1986) - Hageland Records
 É Natal!!? (1987) - Ataque Frontal

Compilations
 Grito Suburbano (1982) - Punk Rock Discos
 SUB (1983) - Estúdios Vermelhos (LP), Devil Discos (CD)
 O Começo do Fim do Mundo (1983) - SESC
 Beating The Meat (1984) - Excentric Noise Records
 Ataque Sonoro (1985) - Ataque Frontal
 Tropical Viruses #1 (1985) - BCT
 Empty Skulls Vol.2 (1986) - Fart Blossom Enterprises
 Bunker (1987) - Bunker Musyk
 1984, The Third Sonic World War (1988) - New Wave Records
 Tributo ao Olho Seco (2000) - Redstar Records
 Compilação Beneficente PEA (2005)

Splits
 Ratos de Porão/Cólera ao vivo (1985) - Ataque Frontal

References

External links
 Official Website

Brazilian hardcore punk groups
Brazilian punk rock groups
Musical groups established in 1979
1979 establishments in Brazil